Global Recordings Network (GRN) was founded by Joy Ridderhof in Los Angeles, California in 1939 as "Gospel Recordings." The mission of GRN is "In partnership with the church, to effectively communicate the Good News of Jesus Christ by means of culturally appropriate audio and audio-visual materials in every language."  This is accomplished by recording the stories of the Bible in the native language or dialect,  by a mother tongue speaker and providing them in an audio format to the community.  Often the languages do not have a written form.  GRN has recorded over 6,000 languages or dialects.  GRN has offices in more than 20 countries.

The language professor Alexander Arguelles notes that it is possible to use these recordings and the accompanying text in a language the learner knows, to start learning any of the languages. For many there is no other way to learn the language. 1300 of the languages accompany the stories with standardized pictures, shown for 10–20 seconds, which allow learners to find short parallel sections in the language they know and the one they want to learn.

The recordings have been used for linguistic research on rhythm and phonological characteristics, vowels,  consonants, for comparative research on phonemes from hundreds of languages, for developing and testing computer systems to recognize languages, and for documenting and reviving rare languages.

Books
1978 - Capturing Voices by Phyllis Thompson, a biography of Joy Ridderhof and Gospel Recordings.
1987 - Catching Their Talk In A Box by Betty M. Hockett, a children's biography from the series "Life-Story from Missions"

See also
 Language education
 SIL International
 Wycliffe Bible Translators

References

External links
 Global Recordings Homepage
 Audiovie Homepage.Audiovie is Global Recordings in most Francophone countries.
  Wheaton College GRN archives collection

Christian missions
1939 establishments in California
Language acquisition